Velmurugan is an Indian playback singer. He is known for folk songs including Madura in Subramaniapuram and Aadungada in Naadodigal and Otha Sollala in Aadukalam. He considers being called by James Vasanthan as one of the turning points in his life.

Discography
All songs are performed in Tamil unless otherwise specified.

Filmography

Films

Television

Awards 

 2007 – American University (Doctorate) Award
 2009 – Edison Award for Best Introduced Playback Singer – "Aadungada"
 2010 – Naattuppura Nayagan Award (by President APJ Abdul Kalam)
 2011 – Naattuppura Nayagan Award
 2014 – Best Play Back Singer 2014 Award
 2017 – Marabu isai Nayagan Award
 2018 – Best PlayBackSinger 2018
 2019 – Radio Mirchy Award
 2019 – Edison Award for Best Introduced Playback Singer – "Kathari Poovazhagi"
 2019 – Kalaimamani Award
 2019 – World Guinness Record (Tamilkalai oyilaattam)
 2020 – Periyar Awards
 2020 – Mirchi Awards – "Kathari Poovazhagi" (Asuran)
 2020 – T Awards – "Kathari Poovazhagi" (Asuran)
 2022 _ gramiya isai kalanidhi virudhu ( tharumapuram aadhinam )

References

External links
 
 

Indian male playback singers
Singers from Tamil Nadu
Tamil playback singers
Living people
Tamil singers
People from Cuddalore district
Bigg Boss (Tamil TV series) contestants
1980 births